Martin Damm and Karel Nováček were the defending champions, but lost in the first round to Olivier Delaître and Greg Rusedski.

Jonas Björkman and Javier Frana won the title by defeating Guy Forget and Patrick Rafter 6–7, 6–4, 7–6 in the final.

Seeds

Draw

Draw

References

External links
 Official results archive (ATP)
 Official results archive (ITF)

Doubles
Ostrava Open